Nesta Maurice Garry Piper (born 4 December 1982) is a West Indian cricketer. Piper is a right-handed batsman. He was born on Saint Kitts, but later moved to Montserrat.

Piper appeared for a West Indies Development XI against Canada Under-19s in 2000. The following year he played three matches at Under-19 level for the Leeward Islands. In 2006, Montserrat were invited to take part in the 2006 Stanford 20/20, whose matches held official Twenty20 status. Piper made his Twenty20 debut for Montserrat in their first-round match against Guyana, with their first-class opponents winnings the match by 8 wickets. Piper scored 11 runs opening the batting, before he was dismissed by Narsingh Deonarine. This was his only major appearance for Montserrat.

References

External links
Nesta Piper at ESPNcricinfo
Nesta Piper at CricketArchive

1982 births
Living people
Montserratian cricketers
Saint Kitts and Nevis emigrants to Montserrat